David Ralph "Boag" Johnson (December 6, 1921 – July 11, 2005) was an American professional basketball player. He played for the Anderson Packers between 1947 and 1950, then the Fort Wayne Pistons between 1950 and 1953.

References

External links
Boag Johnson obituary
Indiana Basketball Hall of Fame profile

1921 births
2005 deaths
American men's basketball players
Anderson Packers players
Basketball players from Indiana
College men's basketball players in the United States
Fort Wayne Pistons players
High school basketball coaches in Indiana
Huntington University (United States) alumni
People from Huntington, Indiana
Point guards
Undrafted National Basketball Association players